Rendlesham is a village and civil parish near Woodbridge, Suffolk, United Kingdom. It was a royal centre of authority for the king of the East Angles, of the Wuffinga line; the proximity of the Sutton Hoo ship burial may indicate a connection between Sutton Hoo and the East Anglian royal house. Swithhelm, son of Seaxbald, who reigned from 660 to around 664, was baptised at Rendlesham by Saint Cedd with King Æthelwold of East Anglia acting as his godfather. He died around the time of the great plague of 664 and may have been buried at the palace of Rendlesham.

Its name is recorded in Old English about 730 AD as Rendlæsham, which may mean "Homestead belonging to [a man named] Rendel", or it may come from a theorized Old English word *rendel = "little shore".

It was also the location of Rendlesham Hall, a large manor house demolished in 1949.

More recently Rendlesham was the site of the Rendlesham Forest incident, a series of reported sightings of unexplained pulsing lights off the coast of Orford Ness in December 1980.

During the summer of 2012 certain scenes of the movie Fast & Furious 6 were filmed on the old RAF Bentwaters base.

Governance
An electoral ward in the same name also exists. This ward includes Campsea Ashe
and at the 2011 Census had a total population of 3,388.

Notable residents
Æthelwold of East Anglia Anglo-Saxon King of East Anglia who reigned between c. 654–664
William Wheatcroft Member of Parliament (by 1517 – 1558?), Member of Parliament for Ipswich in 1558
Leonard Mawe (c. 1552 – 1629), Bishop of Bath and Wells and a Master of Peterhouse, Cambridge and Trinity College, Cambridge.
Laurence Echard (c. 1670–1730), historian and clergyman
Anne Hamilton, Duchess of Hamilton (1720–1771), aristocrat 
Peter Thellusson, 1st Baron Rendlesham (1761-1808), merchant, banker, and politician. He served as 'Member of Parliament for Midhurst, Malmesbury, Castle Rising, and Bossiney. 
Frederick Thellusson, 4th Baron Rendlesham (1798-1852), Member of Parliament for East Suffolk
Frederick Thellusson, 5th Baron Rendlesham (1840-1911), Member of Parliament for East Suffolk
Edith Austin (1867-1953), professional tennis player
Michael Bunbury (1946- ), Businessman and Chairman of the Council of the Duchy of Lancaster

See also
HMS Rendlesham, a Ham class minesweeper
Rendlesham Forest

References

BBC: East Saxon kings

External links

Villages in Suffolk
Civil parishes in Suffolk